Moon King is the synth-pop project of Canadian songwriter and producer Daniel Benjamin.

Moon King's music has been described as dream pop, electronic pop or indie rock. Recently the project's sound has shifted to include disco, synthpop and house music.

Daniel was born in Toronto, Canada, and as a teen was involved in the city's DIY music community, playing in numerous bands and organizing events including several all-night concerts at a circus rehearsal warehouse, and on the Toronto Islands.

In the early 2010s he became closely affiliated with Montreal label Arbutus Records, and began frequently performing as a touring musician with Grimes, Sean Nicholas Savage and Doldrums, while beginning to write and produce his own music.

Fucked Up guitarist Mike Haliechuk released two early 12" EPs, Obsession I and Obsession II, on his label One Big Silence. Performing live with guitarist and vocalist Maddy Wilde, as well as a rotating cast of backup musicians, Moon King toured heavily from 2013-2015, supporting artists including Unknown Mortal Orchestra, Austra, TOPS, Majical Cloudz, Mr Twin Sister and Alvvays, and releasing an album, 2015's Secret Life. 

At end of 2015 Daniel relocated to Detroit, Michigan, and spent the next year immersing himself in Detroit's dance music and DJ culture, which eventually began to influence his own recordings. Eventually a collection of new material found its way back to Arbutus Records in Montreal, who offered to release it. Hamtramck '16, named for the Detroit-area neighborhood, was released in the summer of 2017, documenting Moon King's shift towards disco and dance music.

This was followed by 2019's Voice Of Lovers, and The Audition in 2021, a disco album about learning to become an actor.

Discography

Albums
 Secret Life (Last Gang Records, 2015)
 Hamtramck '16 (Arbutus Records, 2017)
 Voice of Lovers (Arbutus Records, 2019)
 The Audition (Arbutus Records, 2021)

Singles and EPs 
 Obsession I (One Big Silence, 2012)
 Obsession II (One Big Silence, 2013)
 I've Stopped Believing/Apartment Fire (Arbutus Records, 2018)
 Voice Of Lovers SOBO Mixes (SOBO Records, 2020)
 Seconds From You with Vespre (Arbutus Records, 2020)

References

Canadian pop music groups
Musical groups from Toronto
Dream pop musical groups
Canadian indie rock groups
Arbutus Records artists